Augusto Volpini (1832 – 1911 or 1923) was an Italian painter, mainly genre paintings and portraits.

He was born in Livorno, and initially trained with the Livornese painter Giovanni Bartolena. Among his works: Varietà, Daydreaming child, and Il colpo di grazia. In 1886 at Livorno, he exhibited Una mosca simpatica. At the 1886 Promotrici of Florence, he exhibited Studio; in 1887, Odalisca; and in 1889, Povera madre! and a Portrait of Carlotta Cordarf. He became professor and curator of the local academy.

References

1832 births
1911 deaths
19th-century Italian painters
Italian male painters
20th-century Italian painters
20th-century Italian male artists
Italian genre painters
Painters from Tuscany
19th-century Italian male artists